Joseph Henry "T Bone" Burnett III (born January 14, 1948) is an American record producer, guitarist and songwriter. He rose to fame as a guitarist in Bob Dylan's band during the 1970s. He has received multiple Grammy awards for his work in film music, including for O Brother, Where Art Thou? (2000), Cold Mountain (2004), Walk the Line (2005) and Crazy Heart (2010); and won another Grammy for producing the studio album Raising Sand (2007), in which he united the contemporary bluegrass of Alison Krauss with the blues rock of Robert Plant (ex-Led Zeppelin).

Burnett helped start the careers of Counting Crows, Los Lobos, Sam Phillips and Gillian Welch, and he revitalized the careers of Gregg Allman and Roy Orbison. He produced music for the television programs Nashville and True Detective. He has released several solo studio albums, including Tooth of Crime, which he wrote for a revival of the play by Sam Shepard.

Early life
The only child of Joseph Henry Burnett Jr. and Hazel Perkins Burnett, Burnett was born in St. Louis, Missouri, in 1948, and raised in Fort Worth, Texas. His grandfather worked as secretary for the Southern Baptist Convention. His father wanted to be a pro athlete and was courted by the Brooklyn Dodgers, but instead, he got a job in Fort Worth with the Tandy Corporation. Burnett was brought up in the Episcopal Church of his mother. He forgot the origin of his nickname, which he uses without a dash.

Burnett learned golf at an early age. When he was seven years old, he played at the Texas Christian University course. He idolized golf pro Ben Hogan, who was from Fort Worth. Burnett and the other boys occasionally watched him practice at the driving range. Burnett was on the golf team at Paschal High School. In 2014 he participated in the professional tournament at Pebble Beach.

Burnett's musical roots
Burnett discovered music through his parents' 78 RPM phonograph records of Louis Armstrong, Count Basie, Duke Ellington, Ella Fitzgerald, Mahalia Jackson, Dinah Washington, and the songs of Cole Porter. He was drawn to music that took him to unconventional places, and he felt no compulsion to stick to one genre. He heard Peggy Lee, Hank Williams and the Beatles on the radio, was influenced by Buddy Holly, and revered Johnny Cash. He was smitten by the music of Howlin' Wolf, Skip James, the Stanley Brothers and Jimmy Reed.

He also learned about music through his friend, Stephen Bruton. Bruton's father was a jazz drummer who owned a music store on the Texas Christian University campus, where the boys spent many weekends. Bruton, a banjoist, revealed his interest in bluegrass music and field recordings from the 1920s and 1930s. Burnett was enamored with the live version of the song "Wrought Iron Rag" by the Dixieland revival band Wilbur de Paris and His New New Orleans Jazz. The boys would sneak into clubs to hear bands.

At around the same age, Burnett picked up the guitar. Overwhelmed by seeing the Beatles on The Ed Sullivan Show, he started garage bands with Bruton. After graduating from high school in 1965, they spent most of their time at Sound City, a recording studio in the basement of a radio station where Burnett became fascinated by recording. He wrote and produced his first song, "Free Soul", with the Loose Ends under the name Jon T. Bone. His parents had divorced when he was in high school, and his father, with whom he was living, died in 1967. He attended Texas Christian University briefly, then dropped out to work as an artists and repertoire (A&R) agent.

Pursuing music
Burnett produced and played drums on "Paralyzed", the novelty hit by the Legendary Stardust Cowboy. As part of the pseudonymous group Whistler, Chaucer, Detroit, and Greenhill, he appeared on and produced The Unwritten Works of Geoffrey, Etc. (Uni, 1968). During the same year, he produced six songs for a group of friends who called themselves "The Case Hardy Boys". Later this band would move to Los Angeles and become known first as "The Fare", then "El Roacho", and would have songs produced by Burnett, Daniel Moore and Steve Katz. He moved to Los Angeles and recorded The B-52 Band & the Fabulous Skylarks (Uni, 1972) under the name J. Henry Burnett. In 1975 and 1976, he toured with Bob Dylan's Rolling Thunder Revue.

When the Revue ended, Burnett and two other members of Dylan's band, David Mansfield and Steven Soles, formed The Alpha Band, which released three albums: The Alpha Band (1976), Spark in the Dark (1977), and The Statue Makers of Hollywood (1978).

Burnett and singer-songwriter Sam Phillips were married in 1989 and divorced in 2004. He produced many of her albums, including Martinis & Bikinis and Cruel Inventions. He married Callie Khouri in 2006. He has three daughters, including one from his marriage to Phillips.

Solo work
In 1980, Burnett released his first post-Alpha Band solo album, Truth Decay, produced by Reggie Fisher, on the Takoma Records label. Truth Decay was a roots rock album described by the Rolling Stone Record Guide as "mystic Christian blues". In 1982, his Trap Door EP (also produced by Reggie Fisher), released on the Warner Brothers label, yielded the FM radio hit "I Wish You Could Have Seen Her Dance". Burnett toured after the release of Trap Door, opening several dates for The Who, leading a band that featured Mick Ronson on guitar. His 1983 album Proof Through the Night, whose song "When the Night Falls" got some FM airplay, and his 1987 album The Talking Animals were more in the vein of 1980s new wave music, while his self-titled 1986 album was an album of acoustic country music. His 1992 album The Criminal Under My Own Hat tended toward adult album alternative music.

Proof Through the Night was reissued by Rhino Records' Handmade Music in a limited edition of 5,000 on May 29, 2007, in an expanded version. The double CD also included the EPs Trap Door and Behind the Trap Door. In 2006, he released two albums. The True False Identity was his first album of new songs since 1992, and Twenty Twenty – The Essential T Bone Burnett was a 40-song career retrospective.

In 2019, he released The Invisible Light: Acoustic Space with Jay Bellerose and Keefus Ciancia.

Production and other professional activities

Producing
Burnett's production credits include How Will the Wolf Survive? (Slash/Warner Bros., 1984) by Los Lobos, King of America (Columbia, 1986) by Elvis Costello, Martinis & Bikinis (Virgin, 1994) and Fan Dance (Nonesuch, 2001) by Sam Phillips, Raising Sand (Rounder, 2007) by Robert Plant and Alison Krauss, Life, Death, Love and Freedom (Hear Music, 2008) by John Mellencamp, The Diving Board (Capitol, 2015) by Elton John, and the soundtracks The Big Lebowski, O Brother, Where Art Thou?, Cold Mountain and Crazy Heart.

In 1985, Burnett collaborated with Elvis Costello on the single "The People's Limousine", using the moniker "The Coward Brothers". In 1987, he produced Roy Orbison's two-record album, In Dreams: The Greatest Hits and two songs of Mystery Girl. Also in 1997, he wrote songs for the Sam Shepard play The Tooth of Crime: Second Dance, which premiered off-Broadway in New York City with Vincent D'Onofrio and Kirk Acevedo. An album of these songs, Tooth of Crime, was released in May 2008, featuring guitarist Marc Ribot, Sam Phillips and David Poe, whose self-titled debut Burnett also produced that year. According to Burnett, he was inspired by the music of Skip James while composing songs for the updated version of Shepard's play.

In April 2006, he announced that his first concert tour in nearly two decades would begin on May 16 in Chicago at The Vic Theatre. Around the same time, jazz singer Cassandra Wilson released an album of blues songs, Thunderbird (2006), which was produced by Burnett. He wrote one of the album's songs and co-wrote another with Ethan Coen. He produced music for the remake of the film All the King's Men.

In 2006, he produced Brandi Carlile's The Story album, the title song of which became a minor hit and was featured on a special broadcast of ABC-TV's Grey's Anatomy. Carlile's guitarist and bassist, twins Tim and Phil Hanseroth, respectively, used instruments from Burnett's private collection during the "live" recordings in Vancouver, British Columbia.

In early 2008, Pete Townshend announced that Burnett was to go into the studio that fall to help produce an all-covers album for The Who. However, on a May 15, 2008, episode of the NPR radio show All Songs Considered, Burnett threw that project into question. He stated that Townshend had indicated in a blog that he was putting all his projects on hold.

In 2009, Burnett produced albums for Moonalice and Grace Potter and the Nocturnals. In that same year, he also produced Elvis Costello's album Secret, Profane & Sugarcane as well as co-writing the song "Sulfur to Sugarcane" with Costello.

Burnett produced a collaboration album by Elton John and Leon Russell. John, Russell and Bernie Taupin (John's lyricist) wrote songs together in late 2009. The album, The Union, was recorded in January 2010 and released in October 2010.

In 2010, Burnett produced Gregg Allman's album Low Country Blues, released in January 2011.

In 2014, Burnett produced Punch Brothers' fourth studio album, The Phosphorescent Blues, which was released in January 2015.

In 2016, he produced the Italian bluesman Zucchero Fornaciari's album Black Cat.

In 2016, T Bone produced Jupiter Calling by the Corrs; a record that received mixed reviews, but encapsulated the core of their sound and songwriting ability.

In July 2018, he produced Sara Bareilles' Amidst the Chaos in Los Angeles.

Code
In 2008, it was reported that Burnett "started a new venture called Code, which aims to do for music what THX did for movie-theater sound: set standards that ensure the best possible quality." He is opposed to the trend of brighter and more compressed processing, sufficiently so, that he essentially retired from the music business around 1995–1996 and pursued an opportunity to work in theater with Sam Shepard, leading to his work on several films.

The audio format known as Code involves the simultaneous release of multiple sound formats, thus avoiding much of the processing which happens when sound is converted from one format to another. The first album produced with Code was Life, Death, Love and Freedom (2008) by John Mellencamp.

Work in films
In 1992, Burnett worked on some songs with his friend River Phoenix for the movie The Thing Called Love. He was the coach of Samantha Mathis.

In 2000, Burnett produced the soundtrack and wrote the score for the Coen Brothers film O Brother, Where Art Thou?. The award-winning soundtrack featured music from Emmylou Harris, Alison Krauss, Ralph Stanley, Gillian Welch and others performing traditional American folk music, blues and bluegrass—reminiscent of Burnett's 1986 self-titled release. The album was a hit, garnering numerous industry awards from the Grammys, the Academy of Country Music, and the Country Music Association. The album was a commercial success and sold almost eight million copies, according to Billboard.

A documentary film, Down from the Mountain, was made of a benefit concert of the soundtrack performed by the artists on the album; Burnett figures prominently in the film. For producing the soundtrack albums for these two films, and for his wife Sam Phillips's album Fan Dance, Burnett won the 2002 Grammy Award for Producer of the Year, Non-Classical. Burnett went on to produce the less popular gospel soundtrack to the Coens' The Ladykillers.

In 2004, under the name "Henry Burnett", he arranged "I Wish My Baby Was Born" and wrote "Like a Songbird That Has Fallen" and "The Scarlet Tide" for the movie Cold Mountain. "Scarlet Tide", co-written with Elvis Costello and performed by Alison Krauss, was nominated for an Academy Award for Best Song and won BAFTA's Anthony Asquith Award for Achievement in Film Music.

In 2005, he composed the score for Wim Wenders' film Don't Come Knocking.

In 2005, he worked with actors Joaquin Phoenix and Reese Witherspoon for their singing roles as Johnny Cash and June Carter Cash in the film Walk the Line. Witherspoon won the Academy Award for Best Actress for her role in the film, giving special thanks to Burnett in her speech for "helping her realize her lifelong dream of being a country music singer". He also produced that film's soundtrack album and wrote its score.

In 2009, Burnett collaborated on music for the movie Crazy Heart, winning a Golden Globe, an Academy Award, and a Grammy Award for the song "The Weary Kind", which he composed with Ryan Bingham. Burnett was also a producer of the film, along with Jeff Bridges and Robert Duvall.

In 2012, he was the executive music producer for The Hunger Games soundtrack, and wrote the track "Safe and Sound" himself. In 2013, he was the executive music producer for the Coen brothers' film Inside Llewyn Davis.

Real estate development
With Bert Mathews, Burnett is the co-founder of Cloud Hill Partnership, a company that planned to redevelop Herschel Greer Stadium in Nashville, Tennessee. The proposed redevelopment of the  site included music and art space, a community center, open park space and affordable housing. The Cloud Hill proposal was abandoned in January 2018 after archaeologists determined that undisturbed areas on the edge of the Greer property, but not part of the stadium itself, were the unmarked burial sites of slaves forced to build the adjacent Fort Negley.

Awards and honors

Grammy Awards
 Producer of the Year, Non-Classical (2001, 2004)
 Record of the Year: "Please Read the Letter" (2008)
 Album of the Year: O Brother, Where Art Thou? (2001), Raising Sand (2008)
 Best Compilation Soundtrack Album for a Motion Picture, Television or Other Visual Media: O Brother, Where Art Thou? (2001), Cold Mountain (2004), Walk the Line (2006), Crazy Heart (2010)
 Best Contemporary Folk/Americana Album: Raising Sand (2008)
 Best Traditional Folk Album: Down from the Mountain (2001)
 Best Traditional Pop Vocal Album: A Wonderful World (2004)
 Best Traditional Blues Album: One Kind Favor (2008)
 Best Song Written for a Motion Picture, Television or Other Visual Media: "The Scarlet Tide" (2004), "The Weary Kind" (2010)
 Best Song Written for Visual Media: "Safe & Sound" (2012)

Other awards
In 2010, Burnett won several awards for the movie Crazy Heart. He and Ryan Bingham shared the Academy Award for Best Original Song and the Golden Globe Award for Best Song for "The Weary Kind". The song won them a Critics' Choice Award and won Burnett a Satellite Award from the International Press Academy. For the score, Burnett and Stephen Bruton won an award from Los Angeles Film Critics Association and Burnett won the Frederick Loewe award. He shared the award for Best First Feature at the Independent Spirit Awards with the producers (Robert Duvall, Rob Carliner and Judy Cairo) and director Scott Cooper. He was awarded an honorary doctorate in performing arts from the University of North Carolina at Chapel Hill in May 2019.

Solo discography

Compilations

Alpha Band discography

Film and television discography

References

External links

 

1948 births
Record producers from Texas
American country singer-songwriters
American rock singers
American rock songwriters
American male songwriters
Best Original Music BAFTA Award winners
Eels (band) members
The Golden Palominos members
Grammy Award winners
Golden Globe Award-winning musicians
Best Original Song Academy Award-winning songwriters
Living people
People from Fort Worth, Texas
Singer-songwriters from Texas
Musicians from St. Louis
Singer-songwriters from Missouri
Arista Records artists
Columbia Records artists
Universal Music Group artists
Warner Records artists